Cliff Coulson (28 July 1906 – 28 February 1985) was an Australian rules footballer who played with Essendon in the Victorian Football League (VFL).

Notes

External links 
		

1906 births
1985 deaths
Australian rules footballers from Victoria (Australia)
Essendon Football Club players
Frankston Football Club players